Flavia C. Gernatt (April 2, 1921 – November 27, 1995) (née Flavia C. Schmitz) was an American  businesswoman, horsewoman, and dairy farmer in Collins, New York. With her husband Daniel R. Gernatt Sr., she was co-owner of Dan Gernatt Farms, and co-founder of Dan Gernatt Gravel Products, which was the beginning of the Gernatt Family of Companies.

Career

Dan Gernatt Farms

Dairy farming
In 1938 Flavia married Daniel R. Gernatt Sr., and in Collins, New York, the two began a dairy farming enterprise, Dan Gernatt Farms, which in the 1950s was the largest in Erie County.

Horse breeding and harness racing
 
Gernatt partnered with her husband in breeding and racing Standardbred horses, beginning in 1960.

Gernatt Family of Companies
With her husband, Gernatt cofounded Dan Gernatt Gravel Products, headquartered in Collins, New York, after World War II. She served as vice president and secretary of the company; was secretary of Gernatt Asphalt Products and Country Side Sand and Gravel; and was a director of each of those companies. The companies are part of the Gernatt Family of Companies.

In 2005 a 225-acre man-made lake was created on Countryside Sand and Gravel land, named Lake Flavia. A portion of the lake is open to public fishing.

Philanthropy
In 1988, Gernatt and her husband established the Daniel and Flavia Gernatt Family Foundation, a charity which provides financial assistance to organizations and entities in Western New York, mostly in the areas of education, healthcare, Christian-related endeavors, and to those in need or who are homeless. In 1992 Gernatt and her husband donated the construction of a new rectory to St. Joseph Parish in Gowanda, where they were active members and benefactors, and where Flavia was a lay eucharistic minister.

Background and personal life
Gernatt was born on April 2, 1921 in Langford, New York. She and her late husband have a son, Daniel R. Gernatt Jr., who is currently the chief executive officer of the Gernatt Family of Companies; and two daughters, Patricia Rebmann and Phyllis Ulmer. Gernatt died in 1995 following a six-month illness.

References

1921 births
1995 deaths
Businesspeople from New York (state)
Philanthropists from New York (state)
People in harness racing
American women farmers
People from Erie County, New York
Farmers from New York (state)
20th-century American businesspeople
20th-century American businesswomen
Catholics from New York (state)
20th-century American philanthropists